Fasiakhali Wildlife Sanctuary is a wildlife sanctuary in southern Chakaria Upazilla of Bangladesh. located on an island in Bay of Bengal in the south of the country.

Climate
The rainfall is very high during the monsoon season,

History
Two forest villages of 112 inhabitants were set up in 1950. Later on a large population of Rohingya have settled inside the sanctuary.

Management
The park is managed by one range officer and one forest beat guard. It is administered by the Coastal Forest Division at Bhola. It was declared as wildlife sanctuary on 2007 under the Bangladesh wildlife (Preservation) Amendment Act of 1947. No forestry activities is carried out in the mangrove forest except conservation activities. There are 16 villages inside the sanctuary with 33,00 population.

Biodiversity
The sanctuary has a tropical evergreen and semi-evergreen type of forest; the sanctuary is covered with dense shrubby vegetation with patches of dense forest and bamboos.

Flora
The vegetation is composed of forest of Gurjan (Dipterocarpus turbinatus) and Dhakijam Syzygium species. There are plantations of teak (Tectona grandis), Eucalyptus species and Acacia species.

Fauna
The Indian elephant (Elephus maximus) is the major threatened species found in the sanctuary. The elephants are mainly restricted to the Dulahazara, Ringvong and Fasiakhal reserved forest blocks. The savannas and the perennial waterbodies inside the sanctuary support the population of elephants. The other threatened species are Clouded leopard (Neofelis nebulosa) and  Hog badger (Arctonyx collaris) and along with Spotted deer (Axis axis) and  Wild boar (Sus scrofa)

Threats
The threats are encroachment for cultivation land, removal of forest produce and tree cutting by the local people .

See also

 List of protected areas of Bangladesh

References

Forests of Bangladesh
Wildlife sanctuaries of Bangladesh